Diploschizia seminolensis is a species of sedge moth in the genus Diploschizia. It was described by John B. Heppner in 1997. It is found in the US state of Florida.

References

Moths described in 1997
Glyphipterigidae